Sir Roger Sewell Bacon, MBE (23 January 1895 – 17 February 1962) was a British judge who was Chief Justice of Gibraltar (1946–55) and a Justice of Appeal on the East African Court of Appeal (1955–57).

Early life and education 
Roger Sewell Bacon was born on 23 January 1895, the elder son of Sewell Bacon. He was schooled at Rugby before going up to Balliol College, Oxford.

Career and honours 
Bacon had held a temporary commission in the Cheshire Regiment during the First World War. Called to the bar in 1923, he remained in law for the rest of his professional life. He was a Deputy Judge Advocate from 1940 to 1943 and a legal adviser to the War Office from then until 1946, when he became Chief Justice of Gibraltar. Having served in that post for nine years, he was appointed a Justice of Appeal on the East African Court of Appeal in 1955, serving until 1957.

Bacon had been appointed a Member of the Order of the British Empire (MBE) in 1943, and was made a Knight Bachelor in 1958, the year after he retired from the East African Court of Appeal. He died aged 67 at London on 17 February 1962, leaving a widow, Catherine Grace, daughter of the Honourable James Connolly.

References 

1895 births
1962 deaths
Chief justices of Gibraltar
Knights Bachelor
Members of the Order of the British Empire
Alumni of Balliol College, Oxford
East African Court of Appeal judges
20th-century Gibraltarian judges